Echiodon anchipterus, the Closefin pearlfish, is a fish species described by Jeffrey T. Williams in 1984. Echiodon anchipterus is part of the genus Echiodon and the subfamily Carapinae. No subspecies are listed in the Catalog of Life.

Range
The Closefin pearlfish is found in the Northwest Pacific: Japan, the Western Central Pacific: Philippines, and the Southwest Pacific: Australia.

References 

Carapidae